Don Syme is an Australian computer scientist and a Principal Researcher at Microsoft Research, Cambridge, U.K. He is the designer and architect of the F# programming language, described by a reporter as being regarded as "the most original new face in computer languages since Bjarne Stroustrup developed C++ in the early 1980s."

Earlier, Syme created  generics in the .NET Common Language Runtime, including the initial design of generics for the C# programming language, along with others including Andrew Kennedy and later Anders Hejlsberg.  Kennedy, Syme and Dachuan Yu also formalized this widely used system.

He holds a Ph.D. from the University of Cambridge, and is a member of the WG2.8 working group on functional programming. He is a co-author of the book Expert F# 3.0.

In the past he also worked on formal specification, interactive proof, automated verification and proof description languages.

In 2015, he was honored with a Silver Medal from the Royal Academy of Engineering.

See also
F Sharp Software Foundation

References

External links
 Don's Weblog on F#
 InfoQ Interview with Don Syme, 27 March 2009
 F# at Microsoft Research

Programming language researchers
Programming language designers
Australian computer scientists
Living people
Microsoft Research people
Year of birth missing (living people)